A210 may be a reference to:

A210 road, a road in South East London in the United Kingdom
Alpine A210, a sports car prototype manufactured by Alpine that competed in sports car racing from 1966 to 1969
Aquila A210, a two-seat reinforced plastic light aircraft produced in Germany from 2002
Bundesautobahn 210, a motorway in Germany also known as the A210
FinePix A210, a digital camera produced by Fujifilm